Reynold Garcia (born December 15, 1974 in Laoang, Northern Samar), known by his stage name Pooh, is a Filipino actor, comedian, impersonator, singer and host. He is known for currently starring in the comedy gag show Banana Split. He is also known for impersonating boxer and politician Manny Pacquiao.

He was the 2006 and 2007 awardee for Aliw Award best male stand-up comedian. He was again nominated in 2008.

Career
Pooh first worked at the now-defunct Nota'Kwela, a comedy bar in Caloocan, he then moved to Music Box and later to Jazz Café. He was eventually scouted by Andrew del Real of The Library.

Pooh had guested in GMA Network's SiS and in a sequence in an afternoon show of the network. Pooh claimed it was ABS-CBN that gave him the opportunity to get known to a larger audience.

The comedian became a part of Banana Split cast with whom he did skits with and made impersonations as part of the show. By 2013, he became known for his impersonation of Manny Pacquiao. In additional to his stint with ABS-CBN, he occasionally receives assignments abroad as a comedian and impersonator.

Also in the same year, he expressed contentment with his involvement in the show and wouldn't mind if he offered additional roles or not and would not rather force a role unto himself which he considers as not his forte. He also said that he would rather not become as popular as Vice Ganda, saying he wouldn't be able to handle the fame with a similar level to his colleague.

Comedic style
Pooh said that his forte in comedy is more on impersonations and skit-based. He said he is not comfortable of using insults in doing comedy saying that he may not handle it well and end up offending someone.

Filmography

Television
 Eat Bulaga! (GMA) - Himself (2021)
 Niña Niño (TV5) - Andie (2021)
 Stay-In Love (TV5) - Dencio (2020)
FPJ's Ang Probinsyano (ABS-CBN) - Wanda (2016)
 Ningning (ABS-CBN) - Jewel (2015)
 Muling Buksan Ang Puso (ABS-CBN) - Xenon (2013)
 Gandang Gabi, Vice! (ABS-CBN) - Himself (2011)
 Juanita Banana (ABS-CBN) - Sandra (2010)
 Pilipinas Win Na Win (ABS-CBN) - Co-host with Pokwang (2010)
 Your Song: Love Me, Love You (ABS-CBN) - Guest Actor (2010)
 Kung Tayo'y Magkakalayo (ABS-CBN) - Barry (2010)
 Florinda (ABS-CBN) - George (2009)
 Ruffa & Ai (ABS-CBN) - Himself (2009)
 Shall We Dance? (TV5) - Co-host (2009)
 Banana Split/Banana Sundae (ABS-CBN) - Various Roles (2009–present)
 I Love Betty La Fea (ABS-CBN) - as Eda (2009)
 Pangarap na Bituin (ABS-CBN) - Berns Bautista (2007)
 Love Spell: "Click Na Click" (ABS-CBN) - Manilyn (2006)
 John En Shirley (ABS-CBN) - Giovanni (2006)

Films
 Annie B. (Viva Films) - Bar Comedian (2004)

Guestings
ABS-CBN
 ASAP
 It's Showtime
 Kapamilya, Deal or No Deal
 Pilipinas, Game KNB?
 Quizon Avenue
 The Singing Bee
 Wowowee
GMA
 SiS

Awards and nominations

Personal life
As of 2008, Anak ng Pooh-ta has been residing in a house in Caloocan which he rents since 1978. He also had a boyfriend who later went abroad.

References

1974 births
Living people
Filipino male comedians
Filipino male television actors
Filipino television personalities
Star Magic
People from Northern Samar
21st-century Filipino male actors
Filipino LGBT actors